Harold Buddery (6 October 1889 – 23 August 1962) was an English footballer who played for Portsmouth in the Football League and also had spells with Doncaster Rovers, Southend United and Rotherham Town.

Born in Sheffield he played for a number of Yorkshire clubs as a guest during World War I including Barnsley, Bradford Park Avenue, Huddersfield Town and Sheffield United.

References

1889 births
1962 deaths
Footballers from Sheffield
English footballers
Association football forwards
Denaby United F.C. players
Doncaster Rovers F.C. players
Portsmouth F.C. players
Rotherham County F.C. players
Sheffield Wednesday F.C. players
Southend United F.C. players
Rotherham Town F.C. (1899) players
Midland Football League players
English Football League players
Barnsley F.C. wartime guest players
Bradford (Park Avenue) A.F.C. wartime guest players
Sheffield United F.C. wartime guest players
Huddersfield Town A.F.C. wartime guest players